The Lebanon City School District (commonly known as Lebanon City Schools) is a city school district located in Lebanon, Ohio, United States. The school district covers  primarily in the City of Lebanon and Turtlecreek Township in Warren County. It also includes small portions of Union, Salem, Clearcreek, and Washington townships, as well as some small areas that have been annexed by the cities of Middletown and Mason.

The district has approximately 5,800 students.

History

Todd Yohey became superintendent in 2016 and served until his 2020 retirement, when he became the associate director of the Southwest Ohio Computer Association. According to Yohey the Lebanon district board wanted him to remain in his position.

On January 1, 2021, Robert Buskirk became the interim superintendent, though the school board did not choose him as a finalist for the permanent superintendent position. Isaac W. Seevers, previously superintendent of Greeneview Local Schools, was selected as superintendent in April 2021.

Schools
Lebanon High School (grades 9–12)
Lebanon Junior High School (grades 7–8) 
Berry Intermediate School (grades 5–6) building formerly served as Berry Middle School (grades 6–8) from 1969 to 2004, and as Lebanon High prior to 1969
Donovan Elementary School (grades 3–4) building formally served as Donovan Intermediate School from 1995 to 2004
Bowman Primary School (prekindergarten–grade 2)

Former schools
Francis Dunlevy Elementary named after Francis Dunlevy, the first teacher in the area; closed and converted to school transportation center
Alfred Holbrook Elementary closed and used for school administrative offices until 2021 when the old junior high was converted to the new administrative offices 
Louisa Wright Elementary School demolished
Lebanon Junior High School - Partial demolition and replaced after the new junior high school was built. Was originally used as the high school before the current was finished in 2003 is currently the new district administrative offices

References

External links
 
 Warren County school district map

School districts in Ohio
Education in Warren County, Ohio